Werley Ananias da Silva (born 9 September 1988),  simply known as Werley, is a Brazilian professional footballer, Currently without a club

Club career
Werley was born in Oliveira, Minas Gerais, and joined Atlético Mineiro's youth setup in 2002, aged 14, after starting it out at Social. He made his senior debuts while on loan at América-RJ, appearing sparingly in 2008 Campeonato Carioca.

After a loan stint at fellow Rio de Janeiro's club Boavista, Werley was definitely promoted to the main squad by manager Emerson Leão. He made his first team debut on 15 February 2009, coming on as a second half substitute for Marcos Rocha in a 1–2 away loss against fierce rivals Cruzeiro for the Campeonato Mineiro championship.

Werley made his Série A debut on 9 May, starting in a 2–2 away draw against Avaí. He scored his first goal on 6 October 2010, netting his side's first in a 2–1 home win against Corinthians.

On 1 March 2012 Werley was loaned to Grêmio, until December. On 29 June, after being a regular starter, he definitely joined the club, after being involved in Victor's transfer to Atlético. He was a regular starter during the following campaigns, but lost his starting spot after the arrival of Pedro Geromel in 2014.

On 18 January 2015 Werley moved to Santos, in a season-long loan deal. A starter during the whole Campeonato Paulista, he lost his starting spot in August, being overtaken by Gustavo Henrique.

On 23 December 2016 Werley moved to Coritiba.

Personal life
Werley's younger brother Nathan Silva is also a footballer and a centre back. He too was groomed at Atlético.

Career statistics

Honours
Atlético Mineiro
Campeonato Mineiro: 2010, 2012

Santos
Campeonato Paulista: 2015

References

External links

Grêmio official profile 

1988 births
Living people
Sportspeople from Minas Gerais
Brazilian footballers
Association football defenders
Campeonato Brasileiro Série A players
Campeonato Brasileiro Série C players
Clube Atlético Mineiro players
America Football Club (RJ) players
Boavista Sport Club players
Grêmio Foot-Ball Porto Alegrense players
Santos FC players
Coritiba Foot Ball Club players
CR Vasco da Gama players
Atlético Clube Goianiense players
Centro Sportivo Alagoano players